Compton is a city in southern Los Angeles County, California, United States, situated south of downtown Los Angeles. Compton is one of the oldest cities in the county and, on May 11, 1888, was the eighth city in Los Angeles County to incorporate. As of the 2010 United States Census, the city had a total population of 96,456. It is known as the "Hub City" due to its geographic centrality in Los Angeles County. Neighborhoods in Compton include Sunny Cove, Leland, downtown Compton, and Richland Farms. The city has a high poverty rate and is generally a working-class community. Furthermore, Compton is known for its high crime rate, but strong culture.

History

The Spanish Empire had expanded into this area when the Viceroy of New Spain commissioned Juan Rodríguez Cabrillo to explore the Pacific Ocean in 1542–1543. In 1767, the area became part of the Province of the Californias, and the area was explored by the Portolá expedition in 1769–1770. The Domínguez family name is still applied throughout the area, including the Dominguez Rancho Adobe historical landmark, in the unincorporated community of Rancho Dominguez, located between the cities of Compton, Long Beach and Carson. The tree that marked the original northern boundary of the rancho still stands at the corner of Poppy and Short streets.

In 1867, Griffith Dickenson Compton led a group of 30 pioneers to the area. These families had traveled by wagon train south from Stockton, California, in search of ways to earn a living other than the rapid exhaustion of gold fields. Originally named Gibsonville, after one of the tract owners, it was later called Comptonville. However, to avoid confusion with the Camptonville located in Yuba County, the name was shortened to Compton. Compton's earliest settlers were faced with terrible hardships as they farmed the land in bleak weather to get by with just the barest subsistence. The weather continued to be harsh, rainy and cold, and fuel was difficult to find. To gather firewood it was necessary to travel to mountains close to Pasadena. The round trip took almost a week. Many in the Compton party wanted to relocate to a friendlier climate and settle down, but as there were two general stores within traveling distance—one in the pueblo of Los Angeles, the other in Wilmington—they eventually decided to stay put.

By 1887, the settlers realized it was time to make improvements to the local government. A series of town meetings were held to discuss incorporation of their little town. Griffith D. Compton donated his land to incorporate and create the city of Compton in 1889, but he did stipulate that a certain acreage be zoned solely for agriculture and named Richland Farms. In January 1888, a petition supporting the incorporation of Compton was forwarded to the Los Angeles County Board of Supervisors, who in turn forwarded the petition to the State Legislature. On May 11, 1888, the city of Compton was incorporated with a population of 500 people. The first City Council meeting was held on May 14, 1888.

In 1890, a series of votes were held by the residents of Compton, with the aim of shedding significant portions of the city. By the end of the year, Compton was down to only eighty acres of land, with five remaining voters residing within that territory. Due to the limited number of people able to fill positions within the city government, Compton effectively ceased to exist as a functioning city. By 1906, lawyers Emmett Wilson and E.T. Sherer filed suits to nullify the 1890 elections, which in turn restored Compton to a size of 600 acres. Compton was reborn, with elections held to fill open positions.

The ample residential lots of Richland Farms gave residents enough space to raise a family, and food to feed them, along with building a barn, and caring for livestock. The farms attracted the black families who had begun migrating from the rural South in the 1950s, and there they found their 'home away from home'. Compton could not support large-scale agricultural business, but it did give the residents the opportunity to work the land for their families.

The 1920s saw the opening of the Compton Airport. Compton Junior College was founded and city officials moved to a new City Hall on Alameda Street. On March 10, 1933, a destructive earthquake caused many casualties: schools were destroyed and there was major damage to the central business district. While it would eventually be home to a large black population, in 1930 there was only one black resident.

From the 1920s through the early 1940s, the Compton area was home to a sizable Japanese American population, a large proportion of whom were farmers. Shortly after President Roosevelt issued Executive Order 9066 in February 1942, Compton residents of Japanese descent were forcibly removed from their homes and interned for the duration of World War II. Most were initially detained at the Santa Anita Assembly Center; they were later transferred to and incarcerated at Manzanar and other internment centres, called "Relocation Centers."

In the 1950s, middle-class black families began moving into the area, mostly on the west side. Compton grew quickly throughout the decade. One reason for this was Compton was close to Watts, where there was an established black population. The eastern side of the city was predominantly white until the 1970s. Despite being located in the middle of a major metropolitan area, thanks to the legacy of Griffith D. Compton, there still remains one small pocket of agriculture from its earliest years.

During the 1950s and 1960s, after the Supreme Court declared all racially exclusive housing covenants (title deeds) unconstitutional in the case Shelley v. Kraemer, the first black families moved to the area. Compton's growing black population was still largely ignored and neglected by the city's elected officials. Centennial High School was finally built to accommodate a burgeoning student population. The City Council discussed dismantling the Compton Police Department in favor of the Los Angeles County Sheriff's Department.  A black man first ran for City Council in 1958, and the first black councilman was elected in 1961.

In 1969, Douglas Dollarhide became the mayor, the first black man elected mayor of any metropolitan city in California. Two African Americans and one Mexican-American were also elected to the local school board. Four years later, in 1973, Doris A. Davis defeated Dollarhide's bid for re-election to become the first female black mayor of a metropolitan American city. By the early 1970s, the city had one of the largest concentrations of African Americans in the country, at over sixty five percent. In 2013, Aja Brown, age 31, became the city's youngest mayor to date.

For many years, Compton was a much sought-after suburb for the black middle class of Los Angeles. This past affluence is reflected in the area's appearance: Compton's streets are lined with relatively spacious and attractive single family houses. However, several factors have contributed to Compton's gradual decline. One of the most significant factors was a steady erosion of its tax base, something that was already sparse due to limited commercial properties. In later years, there were middle-class whites who fled to the newly incorporated cities of Artesia, Bellflower, Cerritos, Paramount and Norwalk in the late 1950s. These nearby cities remained largely white early on, despite integration. This white middle class flight accelerated following the 1965 Watts Riots and the 1992 Los Angeles riots.

By the late 1960s, middle-class and upper-middle-class African Americans found other areas to be more attractive to them. Some were unincorporated areas of Los Angeles County such as Ladera Heights, View Park and Windsor Hills, and others were cities such as Inglewood and Carson. Carson was particularly significant, because it had successfully thwarted attempts at annexation by neighboring Compton. The city opted instead for incorporation in 1968; notably, its black population was actually more affluent than its white population. As a newer city, it also offered more favorable tax rates and lower crime.

Geography and climate

Compton is bordered by the unincorporated Willowbrook on the north and northwest, the unincorporated West Compton on the west, the city of Carson on the southwest, the unincorporated Rancho Dominguez on the south, the city of Long Beach on the southeast, the city of Paramount and the unincorporated East Compton on the east, and by the city of Lynwood on the northeast.

East Compton
East Compton, also known as East Rancho Dominguez, is a mostly industrial unincorporated community and census-designated place (CDP). The population was 15,135 according to the 2010 Census. East Rancho Dominguez is an accepted city name according to the USPS, and shares the 90221 ZIP Code with Compton. Its sphere of influence is the city of Compton, which has tried to annex East Rancho Dominguez, but business and property owners in the area have opposed the annexation.

Climate

Demographics

2020 census

Note: the US Census treats Hispanic/Latino as an ethnic category. This table excludes Latinos from the racial categories and assigns them to a separate category. Hispanics/Latinos can be of any race

2010
The 2010 United States Census reported that Compton had a population of 96,455. The racial makeup of Compton was 31,688 (32.9%) Black; 24,942 (25.9%) White, (0.8% Non-Hispanic White); 655 (0.7%) Native American; 292 (0.3%) Asian; 718 (0.7%) Pacific Islander; 34,914 (36.2%) from other races; and 3,246 (3.4%) from two or more races. Hispanic or Latino of any race were 62,669 persons (65.0%).

The Census reported that 95,700 people (99.2% of the population) lived in households, 643 (0.7%) lived in non-institutionalized group quarters, and 112 (0.1%) were institutionalized.

There were 23,062 households, out of which 13,376 (58.0%) had children under the age of 18 living in them, 10,536 (45.7%) were opposite-sex married couples living together, 6,373 (27.6%) had a female householder with no husband present, 2,354 (10.2%) had a male householder with no wife present. There were 1,725 (7.5%) unmarried opposite-sex partnerships, and 158 (0.7%) same-sex married couples or partnerships. 2,979 households (12.9%) were made up of individuals, and 1,224 (5.3%) had someone living alone who was 65 years of age or older. The average household size was 4.15. There were 19,263 families (83.5% of all households); the average family size was 4.41.

The age distribution of the population was as follows: 31,945 people (33.1%) under the age of 18, 11,901 people (12.3%) aged 18 to 24, 26,573 people (27.5%) aged 25 to 44, 18,838 people (19.5%) aged 45 to 64, and 7,198 people (7.5%) who were 65 years of age or older. The median age was 28.0 years. For every 100 females, there were 94.8 males. For every 100 females age 18 and over, there were 90.7 males.

The homeowner vacancy rate was 2.9%; the rental vacancy rate was 5.9%. 53,525 people (55.5% of the population) lived in owner-occupied housing units and 42,175 people (43.7%) lived in rental housing units.

During 2009–2013, Compton has a median household income of $42,953, with 26.3% of the population living below the federal poverty line.

Crime
Following the Watts riots in 1965, crime in Compton rose sharply. Although the city was largely exempt from the destruction of the 1965 riot, it prompted middle-class residents to flee over the next few years. By 1969, it had the highest crime rate in the state of California.

In Black, Brown, and White: Stories Straight Outta Compton, Lynne Isbell and two friends from other ethnic backgrounds have written about their lives growing up in Compton during the 1960s and early 1970s. They tell how Compton changed from a mostly white town to a mostly black one and became known as "the Murder Capital of the United States".

Compton's violent reputation reached the national spotlight in the late 1980s with the prominent rise of local gangsta rap groups Compton's Most Wanted and N.W.A, the latter of whom released the album Straight Outta Compton in 1988. The city became notorious for gang violence, primarily caused by the Bloods and Crips. After years of decline in crime, Compton's murder rate skyrocketed in 2004 with racial conflicts between blacks and Latinos.

2005 was the city's deadliest year on record when the city murder rate reached 72 killings
with a total population of 90,000 residents. The spike was the highest since 1991, when the city had more than 100,000 residents. The rise in homicides frightened residents who had long lived with high levels of gang violence but had seen a downturn in violent crime in recent years.

In 2013, the homicide rate was 36.8 per 100,000 residents, a decrease from the mid-2000s peak. Guns are used in the vast majority of homicides in Compton. Between 2000 and 2016, 91.5% were killed with guns compared to the national average of 67.7%. In 2015, there was a record low of 15 homicides while the homicide rate in the rest of the US increased. In recent years, homicides have increased while remaining well below the 1980s and 90s, with 32 in 2021.

The neighborhood lost residents with the worsening safety problems and, after the 1992 riots in the Los Angeles metropolitan area, many African Americans left the city.

Although U.S. News & World Report did not list Compton in the 2011 "11 Most Dangerous Cities" for overall crime rates in the United States, it contrasts the CQ Press, using data from the FBI's annual report of crime statistics "Crime in the United States 2010," which ranked Compton as having the eighth highest crime rate in the country.

Compton experienced a drop in homicide in the late 1990s and 2000s. Crime has stabilized overall in the 2010s. The decrease in homicides has been attributed to various factors, including faster response times by police (reducing shots fired) and better medical care (increasing survival rates). Aja Brown, mayor elected in 2013, helped to settle turf wars between the gangs, which has further reduced the homicide rate.

"Gifts for Guns"
From 1999 to 2004, Compton's murder rate averaged at around 49 murders per 100,000 annually. In 2005, the city experienced an almost 45% increase in murders, although the annual numbers had dropped significantly in the prior three years. The Los Angeles Sheriff's Department began the annual "Gifts for Guns" program within that same year where the citizens of Compton were given the option to turn in firearms and receive a $50–$100 check for various goods in an effort to combat gun violence. People have turned in about 7,000 guns over the last few years, KABC-TV reported. The program's success has prompted the LASD to expand the program countywide.

Mexican (47.8%) and Unspecified African (1.8%) are the most common ancestries in the city. Mexico (86.1%) and El Salvador (5.1%) are the most common foreign places of birth in Compton.

Economy

In 1994, Compton was designated as an "Entrepreneurial Hot Spot" by Cognetics, Inc., an independent economic research firm. Compton made the national list for best places to start and grow a business, and ranked #2 in Los Angeles County out of a field of 88 cities. The city's Planning and Economic Development department provides a business assistance program consisting of a comprehensive mix of resources to small business owners and entrepreneurs. The grocery chains Ralphs and Food 4 Less, subsidiaries of Kroger, are headquartered in Compton. Gelson's Market, a subsidiary of Arden Group, Inc., a holding company, is also based there.

Compton is 10.12 square miles and is fondly known as the “Hub City” because of its unique geographical proximity being in the center of the Los Angeles County boundaries.  As the ‘Hub City’ it makes Compton strategically located along the Alameda Corridor, a rail passageway of 25% of all U.S. waterborne international trade, in addition to being a large industrial center for transit and distribution, business services, high technology, home and lifestyle products, metals, financial services, and textile manufacturing.
The Hub City is part of the Gateway region and has a 77-acre Compton / Woodley Airport that is home to 275 based aircraft and experiences over 66,000 flight operations each year.  This air transportation asset is complemented by the Hub City's four major freeways adjacent to the city's boundaries.  Interstate 710 runs from the seaports through the eastern boundary; the State Route 91 freeway extends through the southern boundary; Interstate 105 runs slightly along the north of the city; and Interstate 110 along to the west.  Additionally, both Interstates 405 and 605 freeways are within two miles of Compton's southern and eastern edges, respectively.

Compton is surrounded by multiple freeways which provide access to destinations throughout the region. The Long Beach and Los Angeles Ports are less than 20 minutes from downtown Compton, providing access to international destinations for customers and suppliers. The Alameda Corridor, a passageway for 25% of all U.S. waterborne international trade, runs directly through Compton from north to south.

The City of Compton's Parks and Recreation Department operates and maintains a total of 16 playgrounds for a combined  of active park space.  Facilities include six community centers, seven neighborhood parks, two walking parks, two competition size swimming pools, three regulation size gymnasiums, a skate park, Jackie Robinson Baseball Stadium, Nine-Hole Par 3 Golf Course, and the two-story  Douglas F. Dollarhide Community Center.

Arts and culture

Some episodes of the sitcom The Fresh Prince of Bel-Air took place in Compton because Will Smith's friend, DJ Jazzy Jeff lived there. Many rap artists' careers started in Compton, including N.W.A (Eazy-E, MC Ren, Dr. Dre, Ice Cube, DJ Yella), Coolio, DJ Quik, 2nd II None, Hi-C, Tweedy Bird Loc, The Game, Kendrick Lamar, YG, Roddy Ricch, and Compton's Most Wanted. In their lyrics, they rap about the streets and their lives in Compton and the areas nearby. Blues musician Keb' Mo' is also from Compton.

Many well-known NBA players attended high school in the city as well. Arron Afflalo attended Centennial High School; DeMar DeRozan attended Compton High School; and Tayshaun Prince, Tyson Chandler, Brandon Jennings, Cedric Ceballos and the late Dennis Johnson attended Dominguez High. Actor/comedian Paul Rodriguez Sr. also attended Dominguez High.

Until recently, Compton's population was dominated by a black demographic, but Latinos now represent the largest ethnic group in the city. Many black professional athletes and entertainers are originally from Compton.  Black people continue to dominate local politics, holding most elected positions in the city. Although an inner suburb of Los Angeles, Compton has seen an increase of middle-class residents in the last few years, due to its affordable housing. With the influx of immigrants and the demographic shift in ethnic population, it was after the 2000 U.S. Census that Latinos were recognized as the majority.

Compton has been referred to on numerous occasions in gang affiliation, gangsta rap and g-funk songs, especially in the late 1980s and throughout the 1990s, and so has attained an association not only with gang violence and crime, but with hip hop music as well. The city is known as the home of many famous rappers.  The Compton Swap Meet is featured prominently in the remix version of the 1995 #1 song California Love.

Compton has evolved into a younger population; the median age of people living in Compton was 25 at the time of the census survey in 2010; the United States average at the time was 35.3.

Compton is home to the Compton Cricket Club, the only all American-born exhibition cricket team. Its founder, Ted Hayes, said, "The aim of playing cricket is to teach people how to respect themselves and respect authority so they stop killing each other."

Historical landmarks
Angeles Abbey Cemetery contains examples of Byzantine, Moorish and Spanish architectural styles. The cemetery was built in 1923 and survived the 1933 Long Beach earthquake.

Compton Airport opened on May 10, 1924. Located on Alondra Boulevard, the airport offers flight training, has accommodations for more than 200 planes, and is home to several aviation clubs.

The Dr. Martin Luther King Jr. Memorial sits in a plaza surrounded by the Civic Center, Compton Court House, Compton City Hall, and Compton Public Library.

The Eagle Tree is a natural boundary marker of Rancho San Pedro dating to 1858. It contains a historic marker and plaque placed by the Daughters of the Golden West in 1947.

The 'Heritage House' was built in 1869 and is a California Historical Landmark. The oldest house in Compton, it was restored as a tribute to early settlers. It is an important landmark of Compton's rich history. At the corner of Myrrh and Willowbrook near the Civic Center Plaza, the Heritage House is a rustic-looking home that will eventually have a museum detailing early life in Compton. For now it shows the stark difference between the simple life of the 19th century and the fast-paced urban environment of the 21st.

Woodlawn Memorial Park is the final resting place of 18 Civil War veterans. It has been a Los Angeles County Historic Landmark since 1946.

Government

Municipal government
After Lionel Cade, an accountant, assumed the mayor's office in 1977, one of the first orders of business was to conduct an audit of the city's finances. It was discovered that the city was $2 million in debt. The administration was able to eliminate the huge deficit in one year by making cuts in every department. It also aggressively sought federal funding to help pay for essential services, which was at least partially effective. However, with the passage of the property tax cutting initiative Proposition 13 by California voters, Compton was one of the cities hardest hit, since it had already eliminated most of the excess from its budget.

Controversies
Civic corruption has also been a widespread problem in Compton. In the early 1990s, United States Attorney Joey Chin conducted a series of investigations, centered on a phony waste-to-energy scheme, that ultimately ensnared a number of prominent elected officials.

In 2000, the Compton Police Department was disbanded amidst controversy and charges of corruption. The police department claims it was disbanded after investigations of gang activity led to then-Compton Mayor Omar Bradley. Once this became public, the mayor charged it was the police who were themselves corrupt, and he disbanded the police department. Omar Bradley has since faced serious corruption charges. Regardless of the situation, an alternative form of law enforcement was sought. Compton's policing needs are currently served by the Los Angeles County Sheriff's Department.

Eric J. Perrodin, the city's former mayor, was investigated in 2007 by the California State Bar for threatening to violate a local newspaper's First Amendment rights after the paper printed an investigative report relative to a contract granted to one of Perrodin's associates. Following the report, Perrodin threatened to yank the city's advertising contract with the paper A Times review of city records shows Perrodin was absent from city board and commission meetings nearly two-thirds of the time between July 2009 and July 2010.

Current recall efforts are a direct response from residents of the accusations of corruption of the city's mayor and council. Some of the accusations involve the issuing of city contracts to personal donors and friends. One particular accusation involved the trash and recycling contract of the city to Pacific Coast Waste and Recycling LLC in 2007, whose leadership donated large amounts of money to Perrodin's political coffers.

Notices of intent to circulate recall petitions against four Compton city officials are expected to be filed in August 2010, by a group of citizens who claim corruption in Compton is being ignored by the same authorities who were shocked by the recent salary controversy in the city of Bell.

Compton had discharged its city manager, in 2010,  the second time in three years. The Los Angeles Times says the City Council voted in a closed meeting, September 9, 2010, to fire Charles Evans. The Times says council members refused to discuss the reasons for their decision. Evans took office in 2007, after the dismissal of previous City Manager Barbara Kilroy. City Controller Willie Norfleet will take over until a permanent manager can be named.

In July 2021, U.S. Representative Maxine Waters called for a Department of Justice inquiry into whether a deputy gang called the Executioners was operating out of the Compton station of the LASD.

Politics
Compton is one of the most consistently Democratic cities in California's political history. From 1976 to 2016, no Democrat received less than 90% of the vote in a presidential election. In 2020, Joe Biden won Compton with 86.58% of the vote, the worst showing for a Democratic nominee since George McGovern, while Donald Trump had the best showing for a Republican nominee since Richard Nixon, practically mirroring the 1972 election results.

State and federal representation

Education

The city is served by Compton Unified School District. The district is a participant of the FOCUS program conducted by the University of California, Irvine. The goals of the program are to improve mathematics and science achievement by uniting the efforts of mathematics, science, education and research library faculty and staff with educators of the school district.

The CUSD provides public education for grades K–12. The district operates 24 elementary schools, eight middle schools, three high schools, and one adult school, which also serves as an alternative school. The district maintains five alternative learning schools.

The four high schools of the CUSD are Centennial High School, Compton Early College High School, Dominguez High School, and Compton High School.

The city is also served by El Camino College Compton Education Center, which offers community college courses for those planning to enter a four-year degree program, as well as those seeking further education in specific trade fields.

Reed Christian College is a non-profit private institution, located in Compton. The program lasts for less than one year, and total enrollment is approximately 120 students.

The Compton Library offers adult, children's and Spanish language materials; reference services; a Literacy Center and a Homework Center; public computers with Internet access and word processing capabilities; public typewriters; and a bilingual story time every Saturday at 12:00 noon.

Occidental's Center for Food and Justice and its Compton Farm-to-School project were featured in a segment of Life and Times, a half-hour news program on public television's KCET in Los Angeles.

Barack Obama Charter School is a kindergarten through sixth grade public charter school.

Infrastructure
The Los Angeles County Department of Health Services operates the South Health Center in Watts, Los Angeles, serving Compton.

The United States Postal Service operates the Compton Post Office at 701 South Santa Fe Avenue the Hub City Post Office at 101 South Willowbrook Avenue, and the Fashion Square Post Office at 2100 North Long Beach Boulevard.

Law enforcement
The Los Angeles County Sheriff's Department operates the Compton Station in Compton. When the LASD replaced the Compton Police Department in 2000, they increased patrol service hours from 127,410 to 141,692. Compton Station is centrally located in the Los Angeles area. The station is easily accessible from the Century Freeway (I-105) to the north, the Gardena Freeway (SR-91) to the south, the Harbor Freeway (I-110) to the west, and the Long Beach Freeway (I-710) to the east. Diane Walker, a 30-year veteran of the Los Angeles County Sheriff's Department, was promoted to the rank of captain by Sheriff Lee Baca, and is now commander of Compton Station. There is also a LASD substation located in the Gateway Towne Center.

Transportation

Four freeways are within or near the city's boundaries and provide access to destinations throughout the region. Interstate 710 runs through the eastern boundary, State Route 91 runs through the southern boundary. Interstate 105 runs slightly along the north of the city, and Interstate 110 along to the west.

The Metro A Line (formerly the Blue Line) light rail runs north–south through Compton. Compton station is in the heart of the city, adjacent to the Renaissance Shopping Center. Artesia station serves the southern part of the city. The A Line connects Compton to downtown Los Angeles and downtown Long Beach.

There is also a Compton Renaissance Transit System that serves the area.

Compton/Woodley Airport is a small general aviation airport located in the city. The airport lies within busy airspace, as it is situated within a few miles of both Los Angeles International Airport and Long Beach Airport.

Greyhound Lines operates the Compton station.

Collectively, these multifaceted transportation links lend justification to the city's familiar nickname of "the Hub City."

From 1902 to 1961, Compton was served by the Pacific Electric Long Beach Line.

Notable people

Sister cities
On January 19, 2010, the Compton City Council passed a resolution creating a sister cities program, to be managed as a chapter of the Compton Chamber of Commerce. The city has established partnerships:
 Apia, Samoa (2010)
 Onitsha, Nigeria (2010)
 Torrejon de Ardoz, Spain (2010)
 San Cipriano d'Aversa, Italy (2020)

The city is also looking to add sister partnerships with Yanga, Mexico, and Port of Spain, Trinidad and Tobago.

See also

 List of people from Compton, California
 South Los Angeles
 Kempten
 Tongva
 List of Mexican-American communities
 List of U.S. communities with Hispanic-majority populations in the 2010 census
 Shooting of Deandre Brunston

References

Further reading
 Adams, Emily, "Bush's Compton Roots Raise Thorny Issue," Los Angeles Times, August 3, 1992, page B-1
 McClave, Stuart (University of Southern California Annenberg School for Communication journalism major). "Compton: Who should govern?" (Opinion). Los Angeles Times. April 3, 2014.
 Miller, Gary J., Cities by Contract: The Politics of Municipal Incorporation, The MIT Press, Cambridge, Massachusetts and London, England, 1981
 Gould, Lewis L. (editor), American First Ladies: Their Lives and Their Legacy, Garland Publishing, New York and London, 1996. See pages 612–613 regarding the Bush family's "nomadic" existence in the cities of Huntington Park, Bakersfield, Whittier, Ventura and Compton, California.
 Straus, Emily E., Death of a Suburban Dream: Race and Schools in Compton, California. Philadelphia, PA: University of Pennsylvania Press, 2014.

External links

 

Bloods
 
Crips
Cities in Los Angeles County, California
Gateway Cities
Incorporated cities and towns in California
California Enterprise Zones
1888 establishments in California
Populated places established in 1888
N.W.A
Chicano and Mexican neighborhoods in California
African-American culture